This is a list of urban areas in the Nordic countries by population. The population is measured on a national level, independently by each country's statistical bureau. Statistics Sweden uses the term tätort (urban settlement), Statistics Finland also uses tätort in Swedish and taajama in Finnish, Statistics Denmark uses byområde (city), while Statistics Norway uses tettsted (urban settlement).

A uniform statistical definition between the Nordic countries was agreed upon in 1960, which defines an urban area as a continuous built-up area whose population is at least 200 inhabitants and where the maximum distance between residences is 200 metres; discounting roads, parking spaces, parks, sports grounds and cemeteries – without regard to the ward, municipal or county boundaries. Despite the uniform definition, the various statistical bureaus have different approaches in conducting these measurements, resulting in slight variation between the countries.

The Nordic definition is unique to these countries, and should not be confused with the international concepts of metropolitan area or urban areas in general. In 2010, Finland changed its definition (stat.fi). This means that according to official statistics, the land area covered by urban areas is three times larger in Finland than in Norway though the total urban population is roughly the same (ssb.no). It also means that while the population of Danish “byområder” is usually less than half of the population of the “functional urban area” defined by Eurostat, the population of a Finnish “tätort” is usually around 80% of the respective “functional urban area” defined by Eurostat. In 2013, the “functional urban area” of Aarhus thus had a population of 845,971 while the “functional urban area” of Tampere had a population of 364,992. According to official statistics, however, the “tätort” Tampere is larger than the “byområde” Aarhus (eurostat.ec). This suggests that direct comparison between Finland and the other Nordic countries may be problematic.

List

Note that the population numbers from the countries are from different years, as Statistics Finland, Statistics Norway and Statistics Denmark release the statistic yearly (albeit at different times of the year), Statistics Sweden only release the figures every five years. The Norwegian data is from 2013 and 2018, the Danish data is from 2014, the Swedish is from 2010 and the Finnish is from 2017.

Also note that some of the statistics have been updated since the first note was made, so some statistics may be from 2018, while others from 2013, etc.

See also
Urban areas in the Nordic countries
List of the most populated municipalities in the Nordic countries
List of metropolitan areas in Sweden
List of urban areas in Sweden by population
List of urban areas in Denmark by population
List of urban areas in Norway by population
List of urban areas in Finland by population
List of cities in Iceland
List of cities in the Baltic states
List of metropolitan areas by population

Notes

References 

Nordic countries
 
 
 
 
 
Lists of populated places in Denmark
Lists of populated places in Finland
Lists of populated places in Norway
Lists of populated places in Sweden